The 2002 Wokingham District Council election took place on 2 May 2002 to elect members of Wokingham Unitary Council in Berkshire, England. One third of the council was up for election and the Conservative party gained overall control of the council from no overall control.

After the election, the composition of the council was
Conservative 30
Liberal Democrat 22
Labour 1
Independent 1

Election result
The results saw the Conservatives win a majority on the council, after having had the same number of seats as the Liberal Democrats for the previous 2 elections. The Conservatives won 14 of the 20 seats which were up for election, including one uncontested seat in Wokingham Without. They made 4 gains from the Liberal Democrats in the wards of Coronation, Finchampstead North and Little Hungerford to finish the election with 30 seats as compared to 22 for the Liberal Democrats. Meanwhile, Labour won their first seat on the council since 1994 after making a gain in Bulmershe ward from the Liberal Democrats. Overall turnout was 32.8%.

The Conservatives said they were delighted with the results which they put down to their campaign on issues including green fields, crime and transport, and to the Liberal Democrats being out of touch with local residents. They said that now they had control of the council they would take action on crime and traffic congestion and review the number of new houses planned. Meanwhile, the Liberal Democrat leader Charles Kennedy described the results in Wokingham as predictable and a "slight set-back", which he put down to them defending seats from when the Conservatives were performing much less strongly nationally.

One Conservative candidate was unopposed in the election.

Ward results

References

2002 English local elections
2002
2000s in Berkshire